Heroman is an anime television series produced by Stan Lee alongside Bones, POW! Entertainment and Wowmax Media that aired on TV Tokyo and related stations between April 1, 2010 and September 23, 2010, as well as streaming on the Crunchyroll Internet service.

For the first 12 episodes, the opening theme was "Roulette" performed by Tetsuya, of L'Arc-en-Ciel and the ending theme was "CALLING" performed by Flow. Beginning with episode 13, the opening theme changed to "missing" performed by Kylee and the ending theme changed to  performed by Mass Alert. In addition to these songs, an insert song titled  performed by Aco was featured in episode 11.

List of episodes

Bonus Episodes
Bonus shorts were included on certain DVD releases.

References

External links
Heroman at TV Tokyo 
Heroman official anime website 
 
 

Heroman